The Bradford Panthers were a motorcycle speedway team based at Odsal Stadium and Greenfield Stadium, in Bradford, Yorkshire, from 1960 to 1963.

History

Odsal
In 1960 the Bradford Tudors renamed themselves the Bradford Panthers. They had one disastrous season at Odsal Stadium with the team finishing bottom of the 1960 Provincial Speedway League before leaving for Greenfield Stadium at Dudley Hill. Speedway did not return to Odsal for a decade.

Greenfield Stadium
The Panthers moved to Greenfield Stadium in 1961. This venue had been used in the Pioneer days and was known as "The Autodrome". The opening meeting was scheduled for 17 July 1961, but due to heavy flooding, construction of the speedway track had been delayed. The contractors commenced work on 18 June, 900 tons of earth was removed and a base of 400 tons of clinker laid, with 240 tons of track dressing finishing the works. As the works overran, the Bradford riders were loaned to Middlesbrough and Newcastle.

Greenfield Stadium was a neat and compact facility typical of the greyhound racing tracks of the time. The stadium was quite small but had held a crowd of 20,000 at one time. The speedway track was laid inside the dog track, which made for relatively poor viewing, and was quite small, approximately 320 yards. The main stand on the School Street side opposite the starting gate had no seating and was covered terracing only. The back straight on the Cutler Heights side had another area of covered terracing. At one end was a huge tote board with no terracing and at the other end the concourse was built up slightly overlooking the dog track with betting windows and a club house. The pits area and car park were in the corner at this end. It was considered a better stadium for speedway racing than Odsal at the time. With  a crowd of two thousand people at Greenfield Stadium it produced an atmosphere whereas two thousand people at Odsal was hardly be noticeable.

Johnnie Hoskins, who had introduced speedway at Odsal in 1945, ceremonially opened the new track. Around two thousand five hundred spectators saw the Sheffield Tigers defeat the Panthers 47-30. The Bradford Panthers club colours of blue and yellow were not seen under the new floodlights until late in the season as the commissioning was delayed. Meetings had to begin in the early evening and as a result attendances suffered. The first season was hardly a stunning success, promoter Jess Halliday left the club at the end of the 1961 season.

In 1962, Mike Parker and Eddie Glennon took over the reins and tried to spark some life into what was by now clearly a desperate situation. The Panthers first meeting of the new season was a 44-52 loss to the Poole Pirates, it set the trend, a mere five of twenty-four meetings resulted in a Bradford victory. Fixed firmly to the bottom of the league, the last meeting at Greenfield Stadium was a double header against Sheffield and Leicester on Tuesday 9 October 1962. Ironically the largest crowd of the season saw a rare Bradford victory. It did not stop the Panthers folding soon after and Bradford had to wait until 1970 before speedway was once again staged in the city – at Odsal with the Bradford Northern (speedway) team.

Season summary

See also
 Odsal Boomerangs
 Bradford Barons
 Bradford Dukes
 Bradford Tudors
 Bradford Northern (speedway)

References

Sport in Bradford
Defunct British speedway teams